Ridin' High  is the third album by the Canadian hard rock band Moxy, released in 1977.  The record got good reviews and got the band nominated for a Juno Award (Canada's Grammy) in 1977 for Most Promising Group of the Year. The album  produced two Texas hit songs "Are You Ready",  and "Ridin' High", as for Canada the album was considered  too hard/heavy for Canadian radio at the time and consequently only the  slowest paced song "Another Time Another Place" received any  airplay in the band's home country. The album still sold well in Canada and  especially  in Southern USA  because of strong live appearances that included shows with AC/DC and  Trooper.

In the words of Earl Johnson "I remember going in doing radio interviews and Ridin High was the single and they would put it on and all the needles would just go tilt over right into the red and the station engineer would be freaking out. And I'm going, we're not going to get any airplay with this. I just knew it. And you know, we were a concert act",

Credits
Buzz Shearman: vocals
Earl Johnson: Guitar - Slide guitar
Buddy Caine: Guitar - Electric guitar
Bill Wade: drums 
Terry Juric: Bass 
Jack Douglas - Producer
Edward Leonetti - Producer
Mike Jones - Engineer
Recorded in Toronto at Sounds Interchange in March 1977.
Mixed in New York City at The Record Plant in March 1977.

Track listing

  "Nothin' Comes Easy" - 4:22   (Earl Johnson)
  "Rock Baby"  - 4:48   (Earl Johnson)
  "Sweet Reputation (Symphony for Margaret)" - 3:54 (Buzz Shearman, Bill Wade, Earl Johnson)
  "I'll Set You on Fire" - 3:17  (Buddy Caine)
  "Ridin' High" - 4:03 (Earl Johnson)
  "Young Legs" - 3:46  (Bill Wade)
 "Another Time Another Place" - 4:39  (Earl Johnson)
  "Are You Ready"  - 3:52  (Buddy Caine, Buzz Shearman)
  "Nothin' Comes Easy (Reprise)"  - 1:02  (Earl Johnson)

Reissued
Moxy’s original catalogue of albums were again available starting in 1994 when Valerie Shearman ("Buzz" widow) oversaw the release of all of Moxy's back catalogue of albums on CD through Pacemaker Records, and again in  2003 this time through Unidisc Music Inc.

References

External links
Moxy official website

1977 albums
Moxy (band) albums
Albums produced by Jack Douglas (record producer)
Mercury Records albums